Dancing Europe is the compilation album by Ukrainian singer Verka Serduchka released in 2007 by Mamamusic and Universal Music.

Overview
In 2007 Verka Serduchka represented Ukraine at the Eurovision Song Contest in Helsinki with the song "Dancing Lasha Tumbai". The song took second place in the final, and on the wave of success Andriy Danylko decides to release this compilation in Europe. In that summer, Danylko signed two contracts with the French division of Universal and the German Warner. To promote the album in France, Verka Serduchka appeared on popular TV channels TF1 and M6.

The album contains both old and new songs. Songs "Vse Bydet Horosho" and "Hop Hop" were taken from debut studio album Kha-ra-sho! (2003) and "Horosho Krasavitsam" and "A Ya Smeyus" were taken from the third studio album Tralli-Valli (2006). Other songs was written by Danylko in English and Deutsch. According to Danylko, the producers themselves chose songs from the old repertoire of Serdyuchka.

In August 2008, the album entered the French albums chart and reached the 105th position.

Track listing

Charts

References

Verka Serduchka albums
Mamamusic albums
Universal Music Group compilation albums
2007 compilation albums
Russian-language compilation albums